is a trans-Neptunian object and highly eccentric centaur on a cometary-like orbit in the outer region of the Solar System, approximately  in diameter. It was discovered through the Sloan Digital Sky Survey by astronomers Andrew Becker, Andrew Puckett and Jeremy Kubica on images first taken on 27 September 2006 (with precovery images dated to 13 September 2005).

Characteristics 

It has a highly eccentric orbit, crossing that of Neptune near perihelion but bringing it more than 1,500 AU from the Sun at aphelion. It takes about 22,500 years to orbit the barycenter of the Solar System. With an absolute magnitude (H) of 8.1, it is estimated to be about 60 to 140 km in diameter. Michael Brown estimates that it has an albedo of 0.08 which would give a diameter of around 110 km.

The object could possibly be a comet. The discoverers hypothesize that the object could come from the Hills cloud, but other scientists like California Institute of Technology's Michael Brown also consider other possibilities, including the theory "it may have formed from debris just beyond Neptune [in the Kuiper belt] and been 'kicked' into its distant orbit by a planet like Neptune or Uranus".

Perturbation 

The orbit of  currently comes closer to Neptune than any of the other giant planets. More than half of the simulations of this object show that it gets too close to either Uranus or Neptune within the next 180 million years, sending it in a currently unknown direction. This makes it difficult to classify this object as only a centaur or a scattered disc object. The Minor Planet Center, which officially catalogues all trans-Neptunian objects, lists centaurs and SDOs together. (29981) 1999 TD10 is another such object that blurs the two categories.

Baricentric orbital elements
 aphelion (Q) = 1570 AU (Heliocentric 2006 AU)
 semimajor =736.67 AU (Heliocentric 1015 AU)
 period = 22,466 yr (Heliocentric 32,347 yr)

Given the extreme orbital eccentricity of this object, different epochs can generate quite different heliocentric unperturbed two-body best-fit solutions to the aphelion distance (maximum distance) of this object. With a 2005 epoch the object had an approximate period of about 22,000 years with aphelion at 1557 AU. But using a 2011 epoch shows a period of about 32,000 years with aphelion at 2006 AU. For objects at such high eccentricity, the Sun's barycentric coordinates are more stable than heliocentric coordinates. Using JPL Horizons with an observed orbital arc of only 2.9 years, the barycentric orbital elements for epoch 2008-May-14 generate a semi-major axis of 796 AU and a period of 22,466 years.

Comparison

See also 
 
 
 
 List of Solar System objects by greatest aphelion

Notes 

 Solution using the Solar System Barycenter
 Read osculating orbit for more details about heliocentric unperturbed two-body solutions

References

External links 
 
 

308933
308933
Discoveries by Andrew C. Becker
Discoveries by Andrew W. Puckett
Discoveries by Jeremy Martin Kubica
308933
20060927